New Camaldoli Hermitage (formally called Immaculate Heart Hermitage) is a rural Camaldolese Benedictine hermitage in the Santa Lucia Mountains of Big Sur, California, in the United States. The Camaldolese branch of the Benedictine family was founded by St. Romuald in the late 10th century. It was consecrated under the Immaculate Heart of Mary and was known by that name for its first decades, but its official name is New Camaldoli.

The Hermitage was founded in 1958 by two monks from the motherhouse in Camaldoli in Tuscany, who had spent two years searching for a site that combined solitude and natural beauty.

Daily life

A dozen monks live and work at the hermitage. Each monk lives in a small cottage, called a "cell," which is divided from its neighbors by a high wall, and includes a small garden. Labors include a guest ministry, retreats, a bakery, a book store, cooking and writing.

In July 2013, Father Cyprian Consiglio, O.S.B. Cam., was elected as the new prior of the hermitage.

Food products
The hermitage produces and ships its own fruitcake, date-nut cake based, and granola on a recipe developed by the monks. The proceeds help to support the hermitage.

Retreats

Retreatants are welcome and over 150,000 people have made retreats at the hermitage. Rooms for men and women are available as well as separate hermitages for longer retreats. Normally all retreats are silent and non-directed.

Location
The hermitage is located in the Santa Lucia Range, along the Pacific Coast Highway (Highway 1), three-quarters of a mile south of the Lucia Lodge. It is situated between San Luis Obispo (85 miles to the south) and Monterey (55 miles to the north). The entrance to the property is marked by a sign with a large, wooden Benedictine cross.

Expansion
New Camaldoli has founded two daughter communities, Incarnation Monastery in Berkeley, California, near the GTU, north of U.C. Berkeley in 1979 and the Monastery of the Risen Christ in San Luis Obispo, California in 2014.

St. Romuald’s brief rule
Sit in your cell as in paradise.

Put the whole world behind you and forget it.

Watch your thoughts like a good fisherman watching for fish.

The path you must follow is in the Psalms—never leave it. If you have just come to the monastery, and in spite of your good will you cannot accomplish what you want, take every opportunity you can to sing the Psalms in your heart and to understand them with your mind.

And if your mind wanders as you read, do not give up; hurry back and apply your mind to the words once more.

Realize above all that you are in God's presence, and stand there with the attitude of one who stands before the emperor.

Empty yourself completely and sit waiting, content with the grace of God, like the chick who tastes nothing and eats nothing but what his mother brings him.

References

Camaldolese monasteries
Benedictine monasteries in the United States
Christian organizations established in 1958
Christian hermitages in the United States
1958 establishments in California
Big Sur